Rineloricaria baliola is a species of catfish in the family Loricariidae. It is native to South America, where it occurs in the drainage basins of the Jacuí River, the Taquari River, and the Lagoa dos Patos in Brazil and Uruguay. It is typically found in environments with flowing, clear or reddish water and a substrate composed of rocks, sand, or mud. The species reaches 23.9 cm (9.4 inches) in standard length and is believed to be a facultative air-breather. It can reportedly be distinguished from other members of the genus Rineloricaria by its unique coloration, with its specific name, baliola, being derived from Latin and referring to the reddish-brown color of the species.

References 

Loricariidae
Fish described in 2008
Catfish of South America
Fish of Brazil
Fish of Uruguay